Janequeo, may mean:

 Janequeo (lonco) or Yanequén, a 16th-century woman lonco and heroine of the Mapuche-Pehuenche people
 2028 Janequeo, an asteroid
 Chilean ship Janequeo, several ships of the Chilean Navy
 Chilean tugboat Janequeo, a Chilean Navy tug 1963—1965